Vice admiral Emmanuel-Auguste de Cahideuc, comte Dubois de la Motte (1683 –  23 October 1764) was a French naval officer.

Emmanuel-Auguste de Cahideuc was born in Rennes (Brittany) in 1683. He entered the navy as a midshipman in 1698, and received his first command (of the privateer ship Argonaute) in 1708.  Following a promotion to sub-lieutenant, he fought at Rio de Janeiro in 1711 during the War of the Spanish Succession.  In 1718 he became a knight of the Order of Saint-Louis.

Dubois de La Motte was promoted to captain in 1738, and directed three campaigns in the West Indies.  In 1751, following the third of those campaigns, he was promoted to Rear-Admiral and made governor general of Saint-Domingue.

He served extensively off the coast of North America, including being assigned to help defend Louisbourg, on Cape Breton Island, in the Seven Years' War.  Although he fell ill shortly after arriving, his superior naval strength delayed British supremacy over the island for a year, the British failing in their attempts in the Louisbourg Expedition (1757).

In 1758, with his active career over (at 75 years of age), he participated in a battle to repulse a British landing near Saint-Malo, which ultimately proved successful.  First knighted in 1718, Dubois de la Motte died in Rennes, France a knight grand cross and vice-admiral.

External links 

Biography at the Dictionary of Canadian Biography Online

1683 births
1764 deaths
People of New France
Knights of the Order of Saint Louis
French military personnel of the War of the Spanish Succession
French military personnel of the Seven Years' War
French people of the French and Indian War
French Navy admirals
Counts of France
Military personnel from Rennes
Governors of Saint-Domingue